Don Share is an American poet. He is the former chief editor of Poetry magazine in Chicago. He grew up in Memphis, Tennessee.

Career
Share, who was named the editor-in-chief of Poetry in 2013, previously served there as Senior Editor. Earlier, he was Curator of the Woodberry Poetry Room at Harvard University from 2000 until 2007. He was Editor in Chief of Literary Imagination, the review of the Association of Literary Scholars and Critics (published by Oxford University Press); Poetry Editor of Harvard Review; a contributing editor for Salamander; and on the advisory board of Tuesday; An Art Project. He was Poetry Editor for Partisan Review until it ceased publication in 2003.

He has taught at Harvard University and has been a lecturer at other institutions including Boston University and Oxford University.

His poetry collection Wishbone from Black Sparrow Press was published in 2012. Squandermania, was Share's second full collection of original poetry (Salt Publishing, 2007), three poems from which were nominated for a Pushcart Prize. His first book, Union, (Zoo Press, 2002), was a finalist for the Boston Globe/ PEN New England Winship Award for outstanding book. His other books include: Seneca in English (Penguin Classics) and  I Have Lots of Heart (Bloodaxe Books, 1997), a selected collection of Miguel Hernández, for which Share received the Times Literary Supplement Translation Prize and Premio Valle Inclán Prize for Translation from the  UK Society of Authors.  His critical edition of the poems of Basil Bunting is available from Faber and Faber.

Share presents the Poetry magazine podcast.

On June 26, 2020, Share announced that he would step down as editor of Poetry at the end of summer 2020.

Works
Union: Poems, Zoo Press, 2002, ; Eyewear Publishing, 2013, 
Squandermania, Salt Publishing, 2007, 
Don Share, ed. Basil Bunting Translated, Bunting's Persia, Flood Editions, 2012,

References

External links
 To Our Readers: Poetry's new editor on the motive of the magazine
 "Share's Poetry: Established Editor and Emerging Poet"
 Poetry magazine

American male poets
Place of birth missing (living people)
Year of birth missing (living people)
Harvard University staff
Living people